South Martin is an unincorporated community in Rutherford Township, Martin County, in the U.S. state of Indiana.

History
A post office was established at South Martin in 1861, and remained in operation until it was discontinued in 1903. The community lies in southern Martin County, hence the name.

Geography

References

Unincorporated communities in Martin County, Indiana
Unincorporated communities in Indiana
1861 establishments in Indiana